Oliver Davies (born 30 November 1995) is an English professional rugby league footballer who plays as a  forward for the Widnes Vikings in the Betfred Championship.

Career

St Helens
Davies began his career with St Helens where he made his professional début as a substitute in a 26–16 away loss at Catalans Dragons.

Swinton Lions
He moved to Kingstone Press Championship side Swinton Lions in 2016 ahead of the 2017 season. The Second Rower spent a full season with them in which he appeared in 22 games and scored on two occasions, against Oldham and Halifax.

Sheffield Eagles
After his time with Swinton, Davies signed a two year deal with fellow Championship side Sheffield Eagles. He helped the Eagles to win the inaugural 1895 Cup as they defeated Widnes Vikings 36–18 in the final.

Widnes Vikings
On 26 Oct 2021 it was reported that he had signed for Widnes Vikings in the RFL Championship.

References

External links
Sheffield Eagles profile
Saints Heritage Society profile

1995 births
Living people
English rugby league players
Rugby league players from St Helens, Merseyside
Rugby league second-rows
Sheffield Eagles players
Swinton Lions players
St Helens R.F.C. players
Widnes Vikings players